ʿAbd Allāh ibn Ḥasan ibn ʿAlī (Arabic: عبد الله بن حسن بن علي) was the son of Hasan ibn Ali. He went to Karbala with his uncle Husayn ibn Ali, and was Martyred at the Battle of Karbala. Also, his name has been mentioned in Ziyarat al-Nahiya al-Muqaddasa.

According to Shia Muslims, Abd Allah ibn Hasan was only 11 years old when he got martyred in the Battle of Karbala. During the last moments of Husayn ibn Ali's life, Bahr ibn Ka’ab was about to strike him when Abd Allah came running out of the tents. He stood in his way and shouted "O, son of the corrupt woman! Are you going to strike my uncle?". The brave boy shielded Husayn from the stroke of the sword, whereby his hand got cut and began to dangle. Abd Allah cried "O, uncle". Husayn took hold of his nephew, drew him to his chest and said "O, son of my brother! Bear patiently what you have suffered, and consider it good, because Allah will make you meet your pious forefathers." At that point Harmala ibn Kahil threw an arrow at Abd Allah, and martyred him in his uncle's arms.

References 

People killed at the Battle of Karbala
Hasanids
680 deaths